Athelington is a small village and civil parish in the Mid Suffolk district of Suffolk, England, about  south-east from Diss. The name is derived from the Old English word Ætheling. The population of the village was less than 50 at the 2011 Census and is included in the civil parish of Redlingfield, in 2005 the population was estimated as 30.

The villages name means 'Farm/settlement of the prince(s)'.

The village is first recorded as Elyngtone in 942 in the will of Bishop Theodred granting lands to a community dedicated to St Æthelberht in Hoxne. 
It was not recorded in the Domesday Book of 1086.

There are six listed buildings in the parish with the church of St Peter being II* listed and the remaining five being grade II listed including the 17th Century Athelington Hall.

Church of St Peter
The church of St Peter is medieval in origin and was majorly restored both internally and externally in 1873–1874. The early 14th century nave and chancel are made of flint rubble with stone dressings with the 15th century tower being constructed of knapped flint with an admixture of red brick. There is a bare-faced flint porch which was added in 1873 with a memorial inscription. Three bells hang in the tower all cast in 1450 by John Magges of Norwich and are currently unringable, the largest weigh approximately 4.5cwt and has a diameter of 28 inches.

Governance
The parish is part of the historic Hoxne Hundred. Between 1894 and 1934 it was in Hoxne Rural District before transferring to Hartismere Rural District which in turn was abolished in 1974 by the Local Government Act 1972.
Today Athelington lies in the Mid Suffolk District of the shire county of Suffolk. The four tiers of government & their respective representatives are:

 Central Suffolk and North Ipswich UK Parliament constituency, Dan Poulter
 Suffolk County Council Hoxne & Eye division, Guy McGregor
Mid Suffolk District Council Hoxne and Worlingworth ward, Matthew Hicks
 Horham and Athelington Parish Council with 7 elected parish councilors.

Historical writings
In 1870–72, John Marius Wilson's Imperial Gazetteer of England and Wales described the village as:
In 1887, John Bartholomew also wrote an entry on Athelington in the Gazetteer of the British Isles with a much shorter description:

Population change

External links

Horham and Athelington Parish Council

References

Hamlets in Suffolk
Mid Suffolk District
Civil parishes in Suffolk